The 10th Jats were an infantry regiment of the British Indian Army. They could trace their origins to 1823, when they were known as the 1st Battalion, 33rd Bengal Native Infantry. Over the years they became known by a number of different titles. The 65th Bengal Native Infantry 1824–1861, the 10th Bengal Native Infantry
1861–1885, the 10th Bengal Infantry 1885–1897, the 10th Jat Bengal Infantry 1897–1901, the 10th Jat Infantry 1901–1903 and finally in 1903 the 10th Jats.

During this time the regiment served in China in the Second Opium War and the Third Anglo-Burmese War. During World War I they were in the 55th Indian Brigade, 18th Indian Division and served in the Mesopotamia Campaign.

The 65th BNI was one of two Bengal Native Infantry regiments which had accepted active service in China in 1857. Accordingly, both had escaped involvement in the Great Indian Mutiny of that year and were amongst the twelve "old" regiments of the East India Company's Bengal Army to survive into the new Indian Army.

After World War I the Indian government reformed the army again moving from single battalion regiments to multi battalion regiments. The 10th Jats now became the 3rd Battalion 9th Jats.

See also
 Jat people
 Jat Regiment
 List of Jats
 Jat Mahasabha
 World Jat Aryan Foundation
 Dev Samhita
 Origin of Jat people from Shiva's Locks
 Jat reservation agitation
 20th Lancers
 14th Murray's Jat Lancers
 9th Jat Regiment
 6th Jat Light Infantry

References

Sources

British Indian Army infantry regiments
Honourable East India Company regiments
Military units and formations established in 1823
Bengal Presidency
Military units and formations disestablished in 1922